This comparison of programming languages compares how object-oriented programming languages such as C++, Java, Smalltalk, Object Pascal, Perl, Python, and others manipulate data structures.


Object construction and destruction

Class declaration

Class members

Constructors and destructors

Fields

Methods

Properties 
How to declare a property named "Bar"

Manually implemented

Automatically implemented

Overloaded operators

Standard operators

Indexers

Type casts

Member access 
How to access members of an object x

Member availability

Special variables

Special methods

Type manipulation

Namespace management

Contracts

See also 
 Object-oriented programming

References and notes 

Object oriented programming
Comparison
Comparison